Stanley Boroughs was an electoral district for the Legislative Assembly in the Australian state of New South Wales created in 1856 election, named after the County of Stanley (part of Queensland after 1859) and including the towns of North Brisbane, South Brisbane, Kangaroo Point and Ipswich. The surrounding rural parts of the County of Stanley were in Stanley County. It was abolished in 1859 and replaced with Brisbane and Ipswich.

Members for Stanley Boroughs

Election results

1856

1858

References

Stanley Boroughs
1856 establishments in Australia
1859 disestablishments in Australia
Stanley Boroughs
History of Queensland